Schoutedenius albogriseus is a species of beetle in the family Cerambycidae. It was described by Breuning in 1954.

References

Apomecynini
Beetles described in 1954